Nika Kirillovna Osipova (born 2 February 2001) is a Russian-born pair skater who competes for the Netherlands with Dmitry Epstein. They made their competitive debut  in February 2021. 

Osipova formerly represented Russia with Aleksandr Galliamov as a junior during the 2016–2017 skating season. Together, they won the Volvo Open Cup in November 2016.

Career

2020–2021 season: Partnership with Epstein 
After a good start on the first day at the 2021 International Challenge Cup to qualify for the 2021 World Championships, they didn't qualify due to a fall the next day.

Programs

With Epstein

Competitive highlights 
GP: Grand Prix; CS: Challenger Series

With Epstein for the Netherlands

With Galliamov for Russia

References

External links

Living people
Dutch female pair skaters
Russian female pair skaters
Dutch sportswomen
2001 births
Russian emigrants to the Netherlands